Cabanı (also, Dzhabany) is a village in the Shamakhi Rayon of Azerbaijan.  The village forms part of the municipality of İkinci Cabanı.

This was the site of a crucial battle of 1500AD when some 7,000 Qizilbash forces, consisting of the Ustaclu, Shamlu, Rumlu, Tekelu, Zhulkadir, Afshar, Qajar and Varsak tribes, responded to the invitation of Ismail I and marched against the Shirvanshah ruler Farrukh Yassar, setting in motion the eventual establishment of the Safavid state

References 

Populated places in Shamakhi District